The 2001 Idaho Vandals football team represented the University of Idaho during the 2001 NCAA Division I-A football season. Idaho was a football-only member of the Sun Belt Conference. The Vandals' head coach was alumnus  in his second season, and Idaho was  overall,  in conference, their lowest win total since 1960, and most losses in 

Idaho played its November home games at the Kibbie Dome, an indoor 16,000-seat facility on campus in Moscow, Idaho; earlier home games in 2001 were held at Martin Stadium at Washington State University in nearby 

Idaho and Utah State stayed in the Big West for other sports, but the Aggies went independent for football (for two seasons).  joined the Western Athletic Conference (WAC), marking the first time Idaho and BSU were not in the same conference  when the Broncos were an

Schedule

References

External links
Gem of the Mountains: 2002 University of Idaho yearbook – 2001 football season
Idaho Argonaut – student newspaper – 2001 editions

Idaho
Idaho Vandals football seasons
Idaho Vandals football